Events from the year 1715 in Ireland.

Incumbent
Monarch: George I

Events
 County Palatine of Tipperary Act, an Act of the Parliament of Ireland, enables purchase by the crown of rights and revenues in County Tipperary held by the Dukes of Ormonde.
 George Evans is created 1st Baron Carbery in the Peerage of Ireland.

Arts and literature
First record of the actress and writer Eliza Haywood, performing in Thomas Shadwell's Shakespeare adaptation, Timon of Athens; or, The Man-Hater at the Smock Alley Theatre, Dublin.

Births
Sir William Johnson, 1st Baronet, pioneer and army officer in colonial New York (d. 1774).
Patrick Lynch, emigrant to Rio de la Plata and landowner.
Tadhg Gaelach Ó Súilleabháin, poet (d. 1795).

Deaths
December 14 – Thomas Dongan, 2nd Earl of Limerick, member of Irish Parliament, Royalist military officer during the English Civil War and governor of the Province of New York (b. 1634)

References

 
Ireland